The Alfa Romeo 110 was an Italian four cylinder air-cooled inverted inline engine for aircraft use, mainly for trainers and light aircraft. The Alfa Romeo 110 was based on the de Havilland Gipsy Major, with approximately 500 units produced. Derivatives of the 110 include the -1, ter and Alfa Romeo 111 (possibly a mis identification of the 110-1).

Variants
Alfa 110-1  at 2,350 rpm
Alfa 110ter at 2,350 rpm
Alfa 111

Applications

Ambrosini SAI.10
Fiat G.2/2
CANSA C.5B/1
CANT Z.1010 Balilla
CANT Z.1012
Saiman 202
Ambrosini S.1001 (110ter)
Agusta CP-110 (110ter)

Specifications (110-1)

See also

Notes

References 

 

Air-cooled aircraft piston engines
110
1930s aircraft piston engines
Inverted aircraft piston engines